In differential calculus and differential geometry, an inflection point, point of inflection, flex, or inflection (British English: inflexion) is a point on a smooth plane curve at which the curvature changes sign. In particular, in the case of the graph of a function, it is a point where the function changes from being concave (concave downward) to convex (concave upward), or vice versa.

For the graph of a function of differentiability class  (f, its first derivative f, and its second derivative f'', exist and are continuous), the condition f'' = 0 can also be used to find an inflection point since a point of f'' = 0 must be passed to change f'' from a positive value (concave upward) to a negative value (concave downward) or vice versa as f'' is continuous; an inflection point of the curve is where f'' = 0 and changes its sign at the point (from positive to negative or from negative to positive). A point where the second derivative vanishes but does not change its sign is sometimes called a point of undulation or undulation point.

In algebraic geometry an inflection point is defined slightly more generally, as a regular point where the tangent meets the curve to order at least 3, and an undulation point or hyperflex''' is defined as a point where the tangent meets the curve to order at least 4.

Definition
Inflection points in differential geometry are the points of the curve where the curvature changes its sign.

(this is not the same as saying that  has an extremum). That is, in some neighborhood,  is the one and only point at which  has a (local) minimum or maximum.

A falling point of inflection is an inflection point where the derivative is negative on both sides of the point; in other words, it is an inflection point near which the function is decreasing. A rising point of inflection is a point where the derivative is positive on both sides of the point; in other words, it is an inflection point near which the function is increasing.

For a smooth curve given by parametric equations, a point is an inflection point if its signed curvature changes from plus to minus or from minus to plus, i.e., changes sign.

For a smooth curve which is a graph of a twice differentiable function, an inflection point is a point on the graph at which the second derivative has an isolated zero and changes sign.

In algebraic geometry, a non singular point of an algebraic curve is an inflection point if and only if the intersection number of the tangent line and the curve (at the point of tangency) is greater than 2. The main motivation of this different definition, is that otherwise the set of the inflection points of a curve would not be an algebraic set. In fact, the set of the inflection points of a plane algebraic curve are exactly its non-singular points that are zeros of the Hessian determinant of its projective completion.

Categorization of points of inflection

Points of inflection can also be categorized according to whether  is zero or nonzero.
 if  is zero, the point is a stationary point of inflection
 if  is not zero, the point is a non-stationary point of inflection

A stationary point of inflection is not a local extremum. More generally, in the context of functions of several real variables, a stationary point that is not a local extremum is called a saddle point.

The tangent is the -axis, which cuts the graph at this point.

The tangent at the origin is the line , which cuts the graph at this point.

Functions with discontinuities
Some functions change concavity without having points of inflection. Instead, they can change concavity around vertical asymptotes or discontinuities. For example, the function  is concave for negative  and convex for positive , but it has no points of inflection because 0 is not in the domain of the function.

Functions with inflection points whose second derivative does not vanish
Some continuous functions have an inflection point even though the second derivative is never 0.  For example, the cube root function is concave upward when x is negative, and concave downward when x is positive, but has no derivatives of any order at the origin.

See also 
 Critical point (mathematics)
 Ecological threshold
 Hesse configuration formed by the nine inflection points of an elliptic curve
 Ogee, an architectural form with an inflection point
 Vertex (curve), a local minimum or maximum of curvature

References

Sources
 
 

Differential calculus
Differential geometry
Analytic geometry
Curves